The canton of L'Argentière-la-Bessée is an administrative division in southeastern France. It includes the following communes:

L'Argentière-la-Bessée
Champcella
Freissinières
Puy-Saint-Vincent
La Roche-de-Rame
Saint-Martin-de-Queyrières
Vallouise-Pelvoux
Les Vigneaux

Demographics

See also
Cantons of the Hautes-Alpes department

References

Cantons of Hautes-Alpes